The Bloc for Croatia is a right-wing to far-right nationalist political party in Croatia.

History
After a disagreement between Zlatko Hasanbegović  and the president of the Independents for Croatia party, Bruna Esih, over two separate electoral conventions, Hasanbegović left the party. In November 2019, he launched the Bloc for Croatia, stating that he was supported by four-fifths of the members of the Independents for Croatia. By December, the party entered an alliance with 2 other right-wing parties; Croatian Growth and the Croatian Conservative Party. However, after the formation of the nationalist party Miroslav Škoro Homeland Movement, Bloc for Croatia entered into an agreement with them.

Presidents of the Bloc for Croatia

References

Croatian nationalist parties
Nationalist parties in Croatia
Right-wing populist parties
Far-right politics in Croatia
Conservative parties in Croatia
Social conservative parties
Eurosceptic parties in Croatia
Anti-communist organizations